Avishai Cohen (born April 20, 1970) is an Israeli jazz double bassist, composer, singer, and arranger.

Early life
Avishai was born in Kabri, a kibbutz in northern Israel. He has Spanish-Jewish, Greek-Jewish and Polish-Jewish ancestry.  He grew up in a musical family at Motza and Beit Zayit near Jerusalem until the age of six, when his family moved to nearby Shoeva. He began playing the piano at 9 years old but changed to the bass guitar at the age of 14, inspired by bassist Jaco Pastorius, whose music was introduced to Cohen by a music teacher in St Louis, Missouri, where Cohen had moved with his family as a teenager. When his family moved back to Israel he joined the Music and Arts Academy in Jerusalem with a focus on acoustic bass.

Later life and career 
Cohen played with Chick Corea and Claudia Acuña.

At age 22, after having served for two years in an army band, Avishai moved to New York City, where he initially performed on the streets while working in construction.
While studying at the New School in New York he became part of Panamanian pianists Danilo Perez’ Trio, which led him to experiment with Latin sounds. In 1997, Avishai Cohen became a member of “Chick Corea’s New Trio” and co-founder of Corea’s ensemble, “Origin”. During the six years of musical collaboration with Chick Corea, Avishai fine-tuned his skills as a performer and composer.

Avishai’s first four albums, Adama (1998), Devotion (1999),  Colors (2000) and Unity (2001) were released under Corea’s label ‘Stretch/ Concord Records’ and featured Mediterranean and Latin influences as well as the use of horns and vocals. Unity was recorded with the International Vamp Band, a group of fellow musicians formed by Avishai, from different parts of the world (Mexico, Argentina, Cuba and Israel). The idea behind the project was to allow different cultures interact and converse using the medium of music.

In 2002, Cohen founded his record label, Razdaz Recordz. "I've always been interested in several genres of music, including jazz, rock, pop, Latin and funk," says Cohen. "I'm always packed with ideas. I decided to start my own label because I'm involved in so many different projects." Lyla was the first album released by Razdaz. Cohen reflected on his work, "Lyla reflects much of who I am as an artist. The International Vamp Band has been touring for two years and I wanted to document that. I also started a rock band Gadu with US drummer named Mark Guiliana [...] I've also been working on pop tunes with a female vocalist named Lola. And, of course, to show the whole picture on the CD, I wanted to acknowledge my relationship to Chick."

In 2005 he released the album At Home, described as one of his most striking records, featuring the composition “Remembering”, a highly evocative trio ballad which became his most beloved and demanded encore at live performances, as well as being highly demanded for use in film and TV.

The cosmopolitan Continuo (2006) followed with great success. In 2007, the live recording As Is, Live at the Blue Note marked his return to New York for a series of live concerts at the Blue Note Jazz Club. 

With Gently Disturbed (2008), a Trio album featuring Mark Guiliana on drums and Shai Maestro on piano, released through his own Razdaz Recordz, Avishai Cohen received major international acclaim by critics and audiences alike.

After residing for many years  in New York City , Avishai moved back to Israel and released Sensitive Hours / Shaot Regishot (2008), which attained gold sales status in Israel. It was the first album to introduce vocals in all its compositions as well as songs in Hebrew. 

In Aurora (2009), Avishai blended jazz, classical music and Sephardic traditions, while further exploring his abilities as a singer.

In 2011, Avishai Cohen released the critically acclaimed album Seven Seas (Emi/Blue Note).

In 2012, he released the duo album Duende (Emi/Blue Note) with Israeli pianist Nitai Hershkovits. For his performance in Duende, he won the 2013 Echo Jazz Award for International Bass Instrumentalist of the Year.

The release of Almah (Warner/Parlophone, 2013), combined his Trio with a string quartet, incorporating  classical music elements for the first time in his career.

2015 saw the release of the new, highly anticipated trio album, From Darkness (Razdaz Recordz) featuring Nitai Hershkovits  on piano Daniel Dor on drums, a Trio configuration that was highly praised by critics.

In 2016, he presented “An Evening with Avishai Cohen”, a project featuring a dynamic core trio of double bass, drums and piano, with the integration of full orchestra. For “An Evening with Avishai Cohen”, he collaborated with over 25 orchestras such as the Gothenburg Symphony Orchestra, the Malmo Symphony , Luxembourg, Brussels Philharmonic , the BBC Concert Orchestra , Philharmonic Orchestra Essen, Brno Philharmonic Orchestra , Lviv Philharmonic  and the Philharmonie de Paris.

In 2017, Avishai Cohen released the album 1970 (Sony), in which he explored a more accessible, pop/rock sound as well as his vocal expression.

In 2019, he returned to his distinctive Trio configuration with his album Arvoles (Razdaz Recordz) featuring Noam David on drums and Elchin Shirinov on piano.

In 2020, he announced that he was joining French label Naïve Records (Believe Digital) as an exclusive recording artist.

In 2021, Avishai Cohen released the album Two Roses (Naïve Records - Believe Digital) with the Gothenburg Symphony Orchestra conducted by Alexander Hanson and with his trio including Mark Guiliana on drums and Elchin Shirinov on piano.

Style 
Cohen's signature sound is a blend of Middle Eastern, eastern European, and African-American musical idioms. His compositions reflect an expansive musical universe and embrace a blend of traditions, cultures, languages and styles, from Hebrew and Ladino folk songs, jazz standards, to pulsating contemporary jazz.  The New York Times describes his 2006 album Continuo as conjoining "heavy Middle Eastern groove with a delicate, almost New Age lyricism".
Cohen often sings in Judaeo-Spanish (Ladino), to which he has a connection through his mother. For example, "Morenika", from his album Aurora, is a very famous Ladino song he grew up hearing his mother singing around the house. Over the years Cohen has been creating and performing more music and arrangements associated with classical music, combining the richness of composed music and the freedom of jazz in his musical statement.

Discography

Albums

As sideman 
With Chick Corea
 Origin, A Week At The Blue Note (Stretch, 1998)[6CD] – live recorded in 1997
 Origin, Live At The Blue Note (Stretch, 1998) – live recorded in 1997
 Origin, Change (Stretch, 1999)
 New Trio, Past, Present & Futures (Stretch, 2001)

With Amos Hoffman
 The Dreamer (Fresh Sound, 1999)
  Evolution (Sunnyside, 2008)

With others
 Gary Barlow, Music Played By Humans (Polydor, 2020)
 Seamus Blake Trio, Sun Sol (Fresh Sound, 2000) – recorded in 1999
 Omri Mor, It's About Time! (Naïve, 2018) – recorded in 2013–16
 Danilo Pérez, PanaMonk (Impulse!, 1996)
 Kurt Rosenwinkel Trio, East Coast Love Affair (Fresh Sound, 1996) – live
 Edward Simon, Simplicitas (Criss Cross, 2005) – recorded in 2004

See also
 List of jazz bassists
 List of jazz arrangers

References

External links

 

1970 births
Living people
Israeli Jews
Israeli jazz musicians
Jazz double-bassists
People from Jerusalem
21st-century double-bassists
Blue Note Records artists
Sunnyside Records artists